JEOS may refer to:

Just enough operating system
Journal of the European Optical Society: Rapid Publications